Sarab Qanbar (also Romanized as Sarāb Qanbar; also known as  Sarāb Qanbar-e Shahīd Hādīān and Shahīd Dāvūd Hādīān) is a village in Gowavar Rural District, Govar District, Gilan-e Gharb County, Kermanshah Province, Iran. At the 2006 census, its population was 111, in 20 families.

References 

Populated places in Gilan-e Gharb County